Hedleya is a genus of  land snails with an operculum, terrestrial gastropod mollusks in the family Pupinidae.

Species
Species within the genus Hedleya include:
 Hedleya macleayi

References 

 Nomenclator Zoologicus info

 
Pupinidae
Taxonomy articles created by Polbot